Valdunu is one of six parishes (administrative divisions) in Les Regueres, a municipality within the province and autonomous community of Asturias, in northern Spain.

The population is 286 (INE 2011).

Villages
 Areces
 Bolgues
 Cuetu
 La Fonte
 Paladín
 Premoño
 Puerma
 Valdunu

References

Parishes in Las Regueras